, better known as , ( – ) was the name given to the leader of the Saika Ikki. He is famous for arming his troops with arquebuses and donning the yatagarasu as his family crest.

There were three people known as Saika (Suzuki) Magoichi, included Suzuki Sadayu (鈴木佐大夫, 1511–1585, true name Suzuki Shigeoki (鈴木重意)), Suzuki Shigehide (鈴木重秀,  – ) and Suzuki Shigetomo (鈴木重朝, 1561–1623).

Suzuki Shigeoki (鈴木重意, 1511–1585), also known as Suzuki Sadayū (鈴木佐大夫), was Shigehide and Shigetomo's father (though the former is disputed). Since records regarding the first half of his life are scant, it is speculated that he traveled as a mercenary. He was employed by the Hatakeyama clan and was a major contributor for repelling the Miyoshi clan. His reputation as a fearsome warrior began to spread and he became a kokujin in the area. When the Miyoshi clan were being attacked by Oda Nobunaga in 1570, the Ishiyama Hongan-ji mob assisted the resistance against the conqueror. Shigeoki came to their aid and led 600 riflemen into battle. His efforts won him fame when he injured one of Nobunaga's valued generals, Sassa Narimasa. Kennyo continued to count on Shigeoki's reinforcements. During this time, Nobunaga was said to have called him "Kennyo's left and right-hand man".

During the Battle of Komaki and Nagakute, Shigeoki aided Tokugawa Ieyasu and surrendered to Toyotomi Hideyoshi's vast army after the battle's conclusion. Though he swore to serve Hideyoshi, Tōdō Takatora suspected that keeping a formidable enemy within their ranks was too risky to trust. Therefore, Shigeoki was sentenced to commit suicide. He died when he was 75. His four sons survived him. Their names were Shigekane, Shigehide, Yoshikane, and Shigetomo.

Suzuki Shigehide is perhaps the better known of the three, known for supporting the Ikkō resistance against Oda Nobunaga during the Ishiyama Hongan-ji War. Shigehide (鈴木重秀 or 鈴木重次,  – ) was possibly one of Shigeoki's sons. He is said to be his second eldest son, but the truth behind the matter remains unknown. This is mainly because his name isn't listed in historical records available to the public, making the authenticity of the "Shigehide" name even more dubious. Though said to be a warrior of distinguished prowess, details regarding his services remain scant. Aside from his distinct hatred for Nobunaga, the rest of his history is filled with half-truths, rumors, or theories. According to the Sengoku Engi, he was said to have been a great warrior.

It is said that he participated during the Hongan-ji riots as well and led 3,000 gunmen into battle. He is accredited for causing Harada Naomasa's death on the field. Despite being allied with the Miyoshi clan, legends state that Shigehide empathized with the Honganji rebels and was only loyal to them. When the Saika group surrendered to Hideyoshi years later, Shigehide was said to have tried to save his family from destruction. However, he couldn't convince Hideyoshi to spare them and his family's property fell into ruin.

From here, the tales surrounding his fate differ from one another. One story says that he served Hideyoshi briefly before he also decided to commit suicide in 1586. Another states, that he faithfully continued to serve Hideyoshi until Sekigahara and joined the Western army's ranks during the Sekigahara Campaign, He participated in the Siege of Fushimi. After Torii Mototada's downfall during the battle of Sekigahara, he is said to have lived the rest of his days as a rōnin in Mito Domain.

Suzuki Shigetomo (鈴木重朝, 1561–1623) was one of Shigeoki's sons. Like Shigehide, he fought alongside his father during the Ikko sect's riots. After his family fell into ruin, Shigetomo became one of Hideyoshi's generals. He participated in the Korean campaign by sending men from his station, Nagoya Castle. 

Following the Sekigahara Campaign, he was spotted by Date Masamune at Siege of Hasedo and joined Date clan, There, he was employed by Date Masamune to be his secondary rifle troop.  Under Masamune orders, he was sent to act as one of Tokugawa Yorifusa's high-ranked bodyguards. He died due to natural causes at age 63. He was said to have been survived by two sons. A few tales said that he became a wanderer and died as a hermit late in his life.

It is unclear whether he or his descendants were known under the "Magoichi" name when he became a part of the samurai class.

Reports of different men using the name range from Wakayama, Ibaraki and Mie prefectures.

16th-century Japanese people
Samurai